Lutuhyne Raion was a raion (district) in Luhansk Oblast of Eastern Ukraine. The raion was abolished on 18 July 2020 as part of the administrative reform of Ukraine, which reduced the number of raions of Luhansk Oblast to eight. However, since 2014 the raion was not under control of Ukrainian government and has been part of the Luhansk People's Republic which continues using it as an administrative unit. The administrative center of the raion was the city of Lutuhyne. The last estimate of the raion population, reported by the Ukrainian government, was

Demographics 
As of the 2001 Ukrainian census:

Ethnicity
 Ukrainians: 71%
 Russians: 26.7%
 Belarusians: 0.7%

Localities 

 Illiriia

References

Former raions of Luhansk Oblast
1965 establishments in Ukraine
Ukrainian raions abolished during the 2020 administrative reform